Indian Nutcracker is an adaptation of the famous story of The Nutcracker into South Indian Classical Dance Form called Kuchipudi. The Dance Drama entitled Swapna Vijayam, is produced, directed and choreographed by Sasikala Penumarthi, who is the Founder / Director of the Academy of Kuchipudi Dance, which was established in 1997 as an Atlanta, Georgia based non-profit organization. The story of Nutcracker is adapted into Telugu Language, with Lyrics provided by the well-known writer Indraganti Srikantha Sarma from Hyderabad, India. Music for this performance is composed by a popular singer from the Atlanta area, Subhashini Krishnamurthy and the dance choreography is by Sasikala Penumarthi, student of Padmabhushan Guru Vempati Chinna Satyam of Kuchipudi Arts Academy, Chennai, India. Sasikala is assisted by two of her senior students Indira and Reneeta Basu. The dance performance will be presented on Saturday, 15 December 2007 at the Robert Ferst Center for the Arts, Georgia Tech., to raise funds for the Emory University Telugu Initiative. The performance will be presented with live orchestral support from Sujatha Rayburn (Female Vocal), Satish Menon (Male Vocal), Sastry Bhagavatula (Nattuvangam or Beat), Suresh Kodandaraman (Mridangam or Drum), V.K. Raman (Flute), Sandhya Srinath (Violin), Seshu Sarma (Veena), Subra Vishwanathan (Mridangam or Drum). More than 35 artists who have trained at the Academy of Kuchipudi Dance will be performing on stage, with more than 15 artists having over a decade of experience. Stage Direction will be provided by Dr. P.V. Rao, Professor in Physics, Emory University and Ravi Penumarthi, Manager, Systems Development, Scientific Atlanta, a Cisco Company. The fundraising committee is led by Prof. Joyce Flueckiger, incoming Director of the Program of South Asian Studies, Emory University.

References

Kuchipudi
Adaptations of works by E. T. A. Hoffmann
The Nutcracker